Moata'a is a village on the island of Upolu in Samoa. It is situated on the central north coast of the island, to the east of the capital Apia. The village is in the political district of Tuamasaga.

The population is 1412. As of September 2022, actor KJ Apa is the Savae chief of the village.

References

Populated places in Tuamasaga